Ernst Dumcke (13 November 1887 – 21 June 1940) was a German film actor.

Selected filmography
 Panik in Chicago (1931)
 Madame Makes Her Exit (1932)
 Under False Flag (1932)
 My Friend the Millionaire (1932)
 Grandstand for General Staff (1932)
 The Countess of Monte Cristo (1932)
 The Burning Secret (1933)
 Song of the Black Mountains (1933)
 The Fugitive From Chicago (1933)
 Spies at Work (1933)
 Happy Days in Aranjuez (1933)
 The Last Waltz (1934)
 A Woman With Power of Attorney (1934)
 Hangmen, Women and Soldiers (1935)
 The King's Prisoner (1935)
 Girls in White (1936)
 Family Parade (1936)
The Chief Witness (1937)
 The Glass Ball (1937)
 The Night of Decision (1938)
 Hello Janine! (1939)
 The Life and Loves of Tschaikovsky (1939)

External links
 

1887 births
1940 deaths
German male film actors
German male silent film actors
Actors from Mannheim
20th-century German male actors